"Didn't Even See the Dust" is a song co-written and recorded by Canadian country music artist Paul Brandt. It was released in May 2007 as the first single from his 2007 album Risk. It reached number 31 at Canadian Hot 100 Chart.

Music video
The music video was directed by Joel Stewart and premiered in May 2007.

Chart positions

References

2007 singles
Paul Brandt songs
2007 songs
Songs written by Paul Brandt